Teodor Todorov (born 1 September 1989) is a Bulgarian volleyball player, a member of the Bulgaria men's national volleyball team and Bulgarian club CSKA Sofia, a participant at the Olympic Games London 2012, bronze medalist at the European Championship 2009 and double Bulgarian Champion (2010, 2011).

Sporting achievements

Clubs

National championships
 2008/2009  Bulgarian Cup, with CSKA Sofia
 2008/2009  Bulgarian Championship, with CSKA Sofia
 2009/2010  Bulgarian Cup, with CSKA Sofia
 2009/2010  Bulgarian Championship, with CSKA Sofia
 2010/2011  Bulgarian Cup, with CSKA Sofia
 2010/2011  Bulgarian Championship, with CSKA Sofia

National team
 2009  CEV European Championship

Individual
 2015 CEV European Championship - Best Middle Blocker
 2016 Memorial of Hubert Jerzy Wagner - Best Middle Blocker

References

External links
FIVB profile

1989 births
Living people
Bulgarian men's volleyball players
Sportspeople from Sofia
Volleyball players at the 2012 Summer Olympics
Olympic volleyball players of Bulgaria
Bulgarian expatriates in Russia
Bulgarian expatriate sportspeople in Switzerland
Expatriate volleyball players in Russia
Expatriate volleyball players in Switzerland
Galatasaray S.K. (men's volleyball) players